Mrzla Planina is a dispersed settlement in the hills northeast of Sevnica in east-central Slovenia. The area is part of the historical region of Styria. The municipality is now included in the Lower Sava Statistical Region. 

The local church just north of the hamlet of Pokojni Vrh is dedicated to Saints Primus and Felician and belongs to the Parish of Zabukovje. It is probably of Romanesque origin, but was extensively rebuilt in the 17th century.

References

External links
Mrzla Planina at Geopedia

Populated places in the Municipality of Sevnica